The Barton House in Salado, Texas was built in 1866.  It was listed on the National Register of Historic Places in 1983.

It is a stone house made of quarry-faced limestone ashlar, built into a hillside.  It was built as a home for an early doctor in early Salado.  It shows skill in stonemasonry and is unusual for its period in its asymmetrical placement of door and its having a wing.

It was listed as part of a group nomination of Salado-area historic resources.

See also

National Register of Historic Places listings in Bell County, Texas

References

Houses completed in 1866
Houses on the National Register of Historic Places in Texas
Houses in Bell County, Texas
1866 establishments in Texas
National Register of Historic Places in Bell County, Texas